The 2017 RAN Sevens was the 18th edition of the annual rugby sevens tournament organized by Rugby Americas North. It will be played at Campo Marte in Mexico City.

The tournament served as a qualifier for the following:
 The 2018 Hong Kong Sevens qualifier tournament, with the champion competing for a chance to be a core team of the 2018–19 World Rugby Sevens Series
 The 2018 Rugby World Cup Sevens, with the champion being eligible
 The 2018 Commonwealth Games, for the highest-placing Commonwealth of Nations member.
 The rugby sevens at the 2018 Central American and Caribbean Games

Teams
The following teams participated:

Day 1
All times are Central Standard Time (UTC−06:00)

Pool A

Pool B

Pool C

Day 2

Round Robin Pool

Cup Tournament

Pool 1

Pool 2

Placement Rounds

Standings

See also
 2018 Rugby World Cup Sevens qualifying – Men
 Rugby sevens at the 2018 Commonwealth Games
 2017 RAN Women's Sevens

References

External links
 Tournament page

2017
2017 rugby sevens competitions
2017 in North American rugby union
International rugby union competitions hosted by Mexico
rugby union
rugby union